David O'Neil (born 8 May 1965) is an Australian stand-up comedian, actor, bass guitarist, writer, television and radio presenter.

Early career
Dave was a Cub, Scout, Venturer and Rover. His late father Kevin was the Group Leader at the 1st/3rd Mitcham Scout Group.

After finishing high school, O'Neil completed a course in primary school teaching; however, he never taught. He became a field officer for the Red Cross, giving talks and training sessions, where he first enjoyed public speaking and the opportunity to tell jokes.

In the late 1980s, he was a member of Melbourne band Captain Cocoa, in which he played bass. His identical twin brother, Glenn, was the lead vocalist.

Radio career
O'Neil ventured into radio in the early 1990s, appearing on the Osso Booko Show on Melbourne community station 3RRR from 1992 to 1997. He co-hosted the one-hour sketch comedy show on Sundays with Vic Plume and Alan Parkes.  He also spent some time on the RRR Breakfast team with Kate Langbroek and regular phone-ins from Dave Hughes.

In 2001 he joined then-new radio station Nova 100 in Melbourne, on the top-rating Hughesy, Kate & Dave breakfast show. He later left in July 2006 for Nova's sister station, Vega 91.5 to co-host the breakfast show Dave and Denise with Shaun Micallef. In 2007, Ian "Dicko" Dickson and Chrissie Swan joined the show with Denise Scott with Shaun Micallef leaving the station.

In 2010, once Vega 91.5 became Classic Rock 91.5, Chrissie Swan departed the breakfast team. However, on 15 July 2010 Ian "Dicko" Dickson and O'Neil were axed from Classic Rock 91.5.

From 2017 Dave was a regular guest and fill in for Sam Pang on Nova 100 “Chrissie, Sam and BROWNY” breakfast show in Melbourne.

Other activities
At the Australian federal election in 2007, O'Neil stood as an independent candidate for the federal seat of Gellibrand in Melbourne's industrial and portside inner western suburbs including Williamstown, Newport, Spotswood, Footscray, Braybrook, Altona and parts of Altona Meadows and Laverton. He received 2.3% of the vote.

In 2017 Dave began a new podcast The Debrief with Dave O'Neil. Each episode he drives a comedian home from a gig and discusses comedy and their career. It's available through iTunes and other podcast apps. Guests on the show have included Colin Lane, Denise Scott, Tom Ballard, Dilruk Jayasinha, Fiona O'Loughlin, Joel Creasey and Cal Wilson.

Daves other podcasts include “Somehow Related” which he co-hosts with Glenn Robins and “The Junkees” co-hosted with Kitty Flanagan.

Film/television appearances

Film
In 2002, O'Neil featured on the hit Australian movie The Nugget along with Eric Bana.
In 2003, O'Neil also appeared with Vince Colosimo and Stephen Curry on the Australian movie Take Away as the butcher.
In 2010, O'Neil features in a cameo performance in the upcoming Australian mockumentary musical film Ricky! the movie.

Television
O'Neil has appeared on Under Melbourne Tonight, The Loft Live, Spicks and Specks, Sleuth 101, Adam Hills In Gordon Street Tonight, Tractor Monkeys, All Star Family Feud, Celebrity Name Game, The Project, Show Me the Movie!, Have You Been Paying Attention? and Hughesy, We Have a Problem.
In 1997, O'Neil featured on the RMITV show Under Melbourne Tonight'''s 1997 Christmas Special.
From 1999 to 2000, O'Neil also featured on the RMITV show The Loft Live on 8 July 1999 and again on "The Loft Live Comedy Benefit" episode on 10 February 2000.
From 2005 to 2021, he also appeared frequently on the Australian music TV show Spicks and Specks.
In 2010, O'Neil also appeared on the first episode of ABC 1 miniseries Sleuth 101, in which he was a guest detective, solving a murder mystery.
From 2011 to 2013, he also appeared regularly on the ABC 1 talk show Adam Hills In Gordon Street Tonight.
In 2013, he appeared on the ABC's Tractor Monkeys''.

References

External links
 Official website
 Biography on Creative Representation
 Somehow Related podcast

1965 births
Living people
Australian male comedians
Australian radio personalities
Comedians from Melbourne
Independent politicians in Australia